Assault on Nijmegen (1589), Maarten Schenk van Nydeggen fails to take the city by surprise during the Eighty Years' War
Siege of Nijmegen (1591), Maurice, Prince of Orange takes the city during the Eighty Years' War
Siege of Nijmegen (1794), French Revolutionary forces commanded by Jean Victor Marie Moreau take the city from the Dutch Republic (ruled by William V, Prince of Orange) during the War of the First Coalition
Bombing of Nijmegen (February 1944), American aircraft bomb the city as part of the Big Week during World War II
Battle of Nijmegen (September 1944), American and British troops capture the city and its two vital bridges as part of Operation Market Garden during World War II

See also 
Timeline of Nijmegen